Huang Chaowen is a Chinese paralympic swimmer. He participated at the 2016 Summer Paralympics in the swimming competition, being awarded the bronze medal in the men's 50 metre breaststroke SB2 event.

References

External links 
Paralympic Games profile

Living people
Place of birth missing (living people)
Year of birth missing (living people)
Chinese male breaststroke swimmers
Swimmers at the 2016 Summer Paralympics
Medalists at the 2016 Summer Paralympics
Paralympic medalists in swimming
Paralympic swimmers of China
Paralympic bronze medalists for China
S3-classified Paralympic swimmers
21st-century Chinese people